Fordingbridge Hospital is a small community hospital in Fordingbridge, Hampshire, England.  The hospital is on the same site as the previous Fordingbridge Infirmary and prior to that the Fordingbridge Workhouse.  The buildings are largely original Victorian with a modern ward for inpatients. It is managed by Southern Health NHS Foundation Trust based in Calmore, Southampton.

History
The hospital has its origins in the Union Workhouse built on a site on Bartons Road in 1885. The site cost a little over £9,000 and the buildings were erected in the Queen Anne style. In the 1930s the facility became a Public Assistance Institution and in 1948 it joined the  National Health Service as Fordingbridge Infirmary for the Chronic Sick.

After the Fordingbridge Cottage Hospital at Highfield House on Alderholt Road closed, its services were transferred to the Bartons Road site in 1984, and a modern facility, known as Ford Ward, opened on the Bartons Road site, which itself became known as Fordingbridge Hospital.

Services
The hospital provides 20 beds for older people and has physiotherapy and occupational therapy support. A small outpatient department in the older building accommodates a moderate range of specialities including: podiatry, ear, nose and throat services, audiology, speech and language therapy, continence service, dermatology services, stroke clinic services and dietitian services.

Notes

References

Hospitals in Hampshire
NHS hospitals in England
Hospitals established in 1885
Poor law infirmaries
Fordingbridge